Carlo Gambuzzi (26 August 1837 – 30 April 1902) was an Italian anarchist.

Carlo Gambuzzi was born in Naples the son of Pasquale and Maria Carolina Landolfi.

He graduated as a lawyer in 1858. He was alongside Garibaldi at the Battle of Aspromonte in 1862, and was lovers with Antonia Kwiatkowska, wife of Mikhail Bakunin.

He made a graveside speech in remembrance of his friend and comrade Giuseppe Fanelli in Naples on 6 January 1877.

References
 In memoria di Carlo Gambuzzi, Napoli 1902 (in Italian)
 Podcast im DLF: Die Familie Bakunin - Anarchie der Liebe

1837 births
1902 deaths
19th-century Neapolitan people
Italian anarchists
19th-century Italian lawyers